Nowbaran (also Romanized as Nowbarān and Nūbarān) is a city and capital of Nowbaran District, in Saveh County, Markazi Province, Iran.  At the 2006 census, its population was 1,931 in 577 families.

References

Populated places in Saveh County

Cities in Markazi Province